Edward Shillington (1835–1920) was a notable New Zealand librarian. He was born in Belfast, County Antrim, Ireland in about 1835.

References

People from County Antrim
1835 births
1920 deaths
New Zealand librarians
Irish emigrants to New Zealand (before 1923)